Life Goes On may refer to:

Film and television
 Life Goes On (1932 film), a British film directed by Jack Raymond
 Life Goes On (1938 film), an American film directed by William Nolte
 Life Goes On (1941 film), a Swedish film directed by Anders Henrikson
 Life Goes On (2002 film) (Das Leben geht weiter), a German documentary film directed by Mark Cairns
 Life Goes On (2009 film), a British film directed by Sangeeta Datta
 Life Goes On (TV series), a 1989–1993 American drama series
 "Life Goes On" (Empty Nest), a two-part television episode

Music

Albums
 Life Goes On (Carla Bley album) or the title song, 2020
 Life Goes On (The Desert Rose Band album) or the title song, 1993
 Life Goes On (Donell Jones album) or the title song, 2002
 Life Goes On (Gerry Rafferty album) or the title song, 2009
 Life Goes On (Lil Suzy album), 1995
 Life Goes On (Onew album) or the title song, 2022
 Life Goes On (Paul Williams album) or the title song, 1972
 Life Goes On (Sash! album) or the title song, 1998
 Life Goes On (Stevie Holland album) or the title song, 2015
 Life Goes On (Terri Clark album) or the title song, 2005
 Life Goes On (Trae album), or the title song, 2007
 Life Goes On EP or the title song, by the B.E. Taylor Group, 1984
 Life Goes On, or the title song, by the Adicts, 2009
 Life Goes On, or the title song, by Norm Brunet, 2002

Songs
 "Life Goes On" (BTS song), 2020
 "Life Goes On" (E^ST song), 2017
 "Life Goes On" (Elisa song), 2004
 "Life Goes On" (Fergie song), 2016
 "Life Goes On" (Gym Class Heroes song), 2011
 "Life Goes On" (The Kinks song), 1977
 "Life Goes On" (LeAnn Rimes song), 2002
 "Life Goes On" (Lil Baby song), 2018
 "Life Goes On" (Little Texas song), 1995
 "Life Goes On" (Oliver Tree song), 2021
 "Life Goes On" (Poison song), 1991
 "L.I.F.E.G.O.E.S.O.N.", by Noah and the Whale, 2011
 "Life Goes On", by Bobby Vinton from Mr. Lonely, 1964
 "Life Goes On", by the Damned from Strawberries, 1982
 "Life Goes On", by Dragon Ash, 2002
 "Life Goes On", by Jeff Watson from Around the Sun, 1993
 "Life Goes On", by Mika Arisaka, featured in Mobile Suit Gundam SEED Destiny
 "Life Goes On", by Nik Kershaw from Radio Musicola, 1986
 "Life Goes On", by Sérgio Mendes from Brasil '88, 1978
 "Life Goes On", by Tupac Shakur from All Eyez on Me, 1996
 "Life Goes On", by U-ya Asaoka, opening theme for Chouseishin Gransazer

Other media
 "Life Goes On" (news article), a Russian newspaper article about the start of the 2008 South Ossetia war
 Life Goes On, a 2012 novel by Hans Keilson

See also
 And Life Goes On, a 1992 Iranian film by Abbas Kiarostami
 "Ob-La-Di, Ob-La-Da", a 1968 song by The Beatles, the lyrics of which repeat the phrase "Life goes on"
 "Life Goes On & On", a song by Home Made Kazoku